Pogonocherus ehdenensis is a species of beetle in the family Cerambycidae. It was described by Sama and Rapuzzi in 2000. It is known from Lebanon.

References

Pogonocherini
Beetles described in 2000